Parmatma Ek Sevak is a minor sect of Hinduism mostly restricted to eastern Vidarbha and central India. The sect was founded by Mahantyagi Baba Jumdevji.

The sect commands worship of one god and abstinence from alcohol. Though being a part of Hinduism, the sect forbids its followers to worship any of the Hindu deities.

Mahantyagi Baba Jumdevji 
Mahantyagi Baba Jumdevji was born on 3 April 1921 at Nagpur, Maharashtra, INDIA in a humble and poor family. His father Vithobaji Thubrikar was a weaver. Baba Jumdevji had three elder brothers named Balkrishna, Narayan, Jagoba and one younger brother named Maroti. As Vithobaji Thubrikar was a weaver it was his family's occupation and mother Saraswati bai was a housewife, He couldn't continue his education after fourth standard due to poverty. Even though he was formally not much educated, his metaphysical spirit and potentiality was of very high order. He had an undistinguished childhood besides his passion for wrestling. He married Varanasi bai in 1938 at the tender age of 17 and decided to leave his family profession for no solid reasons. He then served a business firm of Seth Kesarimal as an employee for some years as gold trader. Later, he started working as a contractor in Nagpur Municipal Corporation.

Baba Jumdevji got his only son named Mahadev (Mano) had studied in extremely difficult and poor conditions but as baba encouraged him to go for higher education and as a result Dr. Mahadev (Mano) Jumdevji Thubrikar was honored with engineering along with multiple certifications like New York University, MS, PhD (1970-1975), University of Virginia, Dept. of Surgery (1975-1991), Carolinas Medical Center, Heineman Research (1991-2004), Distinguished Scientist, Edwards Lifesciences, Irvine, CA (2004-2007), Director of BME, South Dakota School of Mines & Technology, Rapid City, SD (2007-2010), Thubrikar Aortic Valve, Inc. (2010 – present), President and Founder, Author of "The Aortic Valve". Today, he is the only person is an associate professor at the University of Virginia Medical Center, Virginia, USA, Department of Surgery and Director of Surgical Research. He has done research on Heart Valves, especially on Normal, Dissolved and Bioprosthetic Orative Valves. Many of his research papers have received national recognition in USA. Many books written on multiple subjects have been applied into the curriculum of the students for many years in various universities. He was awarded the Merit Certificate and National Institute of Health, U.S.A. by the New York Academy of Medicine. He has honored with the Research Career Development Award. Today, he is the seventh best-known Medical Scientist among the world's top nine scientists.

Subsequently, Baba Jumdevji had got an intuitive perception regarding the omniscient God Hanuman and got inspired to perform pooja and havan regularly. He also visualized the presence of Supreme One God in the havan and made it sure that Lord Hanuman destroyed tens of thousands evil ghosts in the process of havan. Moreover, he gained a bliss and realized it was a path for enlightenment. His life was dedicated for the services of the masses irrespective of caste, class, creed or religion. He was all the while absorbed in spiritual pursuits. He critically observed the nature of the people and channelized them for the cause of their upliftment. He had self realized vision and throughout his life, taught the lessons for the purity of hearts and malice for none.

A supernatural incident took place in Baba's life on 25 August 1948. He fell into a trance during a havan when he got the intuition that all the existing Gods and Goddesses introduced themselves to him. Finally a God claimed to be the "Supreme One" made his presence felt and asked Baba that he was always present with him and he would die if he left, so the family members and neighbors were convinced that Baba had gained a heavenly blessing and the visualization of the presence of God in his life. The message spread like a wild-fire.

Baba Jumdevji attained a state of nirvana. He achieved enlightenment. After having a transcendental experience, he was blessed by the Supreme God. It was something that provided Baba Jumdevji an impetus to develop more quickly as spiritual and social healer. When he saw that there were many unhappy and unsatisfied people in country, he shared with them the blessings which he found during enlightenment and worked towards betterment of such unprivileged people.

Baba Jumdevji established a new religion named "Manav Dharma" on the principles of humanity. It was Baba's sincere attempt to purify and reform the doctrines of religious philosophy, to deepen the sense of spirituality among his followers, to reassert their moral dimension and to inspire social reforms. Really, it was an actualization of Baba's promise that he made to God in his trance. He catered his spiritual knowledge to the poor and needy people in a selfless manner as per his promise made to God. Similarly, he formed many organizations along with "Manav Dharma" to benefit and secure life of poor and uneducated people. People belonging to "Manav Dharma" are called "Paramatma Ek Sevak". He initiated social reform movements and struggled hard against blind faith, untouchability, superstition, cow-slaughter and other social evils.

At the later stage, Baba Jumdevji kept himself busy in spreading spiritual awakening among people. He inculcated the value of spirituality which conceded countless followers. He always urged his family member and followers to stay united and organized. Saturdays were fixed for weekly gatherings for the purpose of discussion and reading of religious books.

Consequently, there had been an enormous increase in his followers. A voluntary contribution of funds among the followers was introduced and the collected amount was used for philanthropic works. Having a farsighted vision he extended his sphere to social activities. His organization became strong and expanded. A registered organization named "Parampujya Parmatma Ek Sewak Mandal" Nagpur had been launched on 4 December 1969. The followers of Baba, under his auspicious guidance, have built a big structure at Nagpur named "Sanskrutik Bhawan" nowadays called as "Manav Mandir", it has residential and library facilities for the poor students belonging to the families associated with the organization. Later, "Parampujya Parmatma Ek Sewak Mandal", Nagpur declared "Mahantyagi Baba Jumdevji" as abbot for Nagpur Mandal. Currently, followers are available in Maharashtra, Chhattisgarh, Madhya Pradesh, Gujarat and all over India and many are settled in abroad, the number of their disciples are even more than 5 Million till 2019 and its growing ore on day by day.

Similarly Baba Jumdevji, the philanthropist has established many social welfare organizations which are listed as below:

 Parampujya Parmatma Ek Sevak Mandal, Nagpur (Manav Mandir, Wardhman Nagar, Nagpur)
 Parmatma Ek Sewak Nagrik Sahkari Bank, Maryadit, Nagpur
 Parmatma Ek Sevak Manavdharm Aashram, Mouda
 Parmatma Ek Sewak Bahu Uddeshiya Grahak Bhandar, Nagpur
 Parmatma Ek Sewak Dugdh Utpadak Sahakari Sanstha, Salaimeta, Taluka - Ramtek, District - Nagpur
 Parmatma Ek Sewak Dugdh Utpadak Sahakari Sanstha, Dhop, Taluka - Mohadi, District - Bhandara
 Parmatma Ek Sewak Dharmarth Dawakhana, Nagpur
 Parmatma Ek Sewak Dharmarth Dawakhana, Dhop, Taluka - Mohadi, District – Bhandara

Through these social organizations he served the humanity till his last breath.

Baba Jumdevji died on 3 October 1996. He thought deeply, spoke gently and was more often a reconciler of spiritual opinions than an upholder of any vested interests. He believed in thoroughness and impeccability, always dived deep into the facts for procuring substance rather than merely professing information.

"Manav Dharma" has been infusing all aspects of Jumdevji's divinely perceived knowledge to its devotees since its inception. It has affirmed a new culture in our society by making us aware about the irrefutable and irreplaceable necessity of the virtues like truth and non-violence. Baba Jumdevji has propounded a new philosophy of Four Elements, Three Words and Five major rules which itself signifies principles to achieve heavenly bliss. They are as follows:

Four Elements:

 Divine One
 Die or live, in the name of God
 Restore life by eradicating sorrows
 Desired Food (Desired wish)

Three Words:

 Speaking truth
 Keeping the limits
 Lovingly behaving

Five Rules:

 Pray one God with devotion and dedication
 Establish truth, limitation and love in family and followers
 Stop harmful addictions and habits like Alcohol, Gambling, Lottery, Cock-fighting, Stealing, Lying, Anger and to prohibit women from using abusive words to their husband and children
 Maintain integrity in family and followers
 Keep the family small and demarcated

According to Baba Jumdevji, God is not in any shape of a human being but it is a divine power which is available for 24 hours and it is shapeless, alert and awake. Babaji has urged his followers to keep the face of idol of Lord Hanuman towards east and the worshipper's face towards West.

This justification for maintaining is because the Sun rises in the East and therefore, this direction is always shining and vice versa for West as the Sun sets in the direction. Since human race has been suffering from a lot of miseries, he should keep the idol of the lord at his front to derive divine power to overcome these miseries.

In a nutshell, the main object of this religion is that man should behave like a man and his life should be based on dedication, sacrifice, mercy, forgiveness and peace and this is the real "Manav Dharma"

Preachings of Baba Jumdevji towards Humanity

 The current situation of corruption cannot be handled and controlled by human beings but it can be brought into control only by God's grace and divine power. If the human beings want to keep themselves secure from the transformation of the Age, they need to follow the path of Truth, Good Conduct and Love to get the divine peace. This message was conveyed on 1 September 1980.

 The purpose of this divine path is to follow the path of Truth, Good conduct and Love that destroys each and every sorrow of the follower of this who becomes the Enlightened One. This message was conveyed on 16 February 1991, at Sevak Sammelan, Ramtek, and District Nagpur.

 The Almighty has to convert the Iron Age and bring forth the Golden Age where only the Truth prevails and nothing else. Every man and woman has to be Enlightened One has to repent for the misdeeds done by one on this path of enlightenment. Bai Sati is not of less significance than Renuka God is the giver of intelligence and divine power is the greatest of powers and we all have to perform good deeds towards our family and Sevaks. This message was conveyed on 28 September 1990 at Gat No.03, Lalganj, Nagpur.

 The Citizens of this country should become Enlightened Ones because it is the transformation of the Age. After the Iron Age, there will be the Silver Age. It is the cycle of the Ages. Only those who follow the path of Truth, Good Conduct and Love shall remain safe and secure when the Day of Judgment will come.

 There exists only one God and we should not search God in the idols. God exists in every human soul and does not exist in physical form to identify.

 Baba was strictly against pretentious behavior like keeping long hair, beard, wearing Rudraksh and other beads, keeping Kamandal etc. and believed in simplicity.

 Truth signifies brave and fearless expression of heart. Words spoken to appease others take us towards falsehood. One should always speak the truth even if it endangers one's life because God loves truth and his truthful followers.

 Baba believed that we should follow the path taught to us by Gods for example Lord Rama destroyed evil in the form of Ravana. We should follow the path shown by Lord Rama rather than just worshipping lord Rama's idol.

 Baba was against worshipping the Deads as after death a man vanishes in the supreme God and what remains of him is only ash of his body, so it is uncalled for to worship the ash. A man with truthful means and undivided attention towards a single goal with faith in one God can accomplish his or her desired tasks.

 Baba was against dividing humans in the name of religion and religious practices because according to his philosophy dividing humans is like dividing God.

 Baba was farsighted in his approach and preached family planning laying down following conditions for his followers, a. One should not have more than two issues and should follow family planning measures consulting the doctors. b. The age of marriage for a male should not be less than 25 years and Baba advocated proper gap between two issues, so that the family size should be small and the mother remains healthy.

 Baba advocated cooperative system for his downtrodden followers who were not only poor but also illiterate. The followers were exploited by the vicious system of money lenders. To save them from this vicious system Baba propounded the philosophy of cooperative system and fund raining for their welfare. On this philosophy he established "Sevak Nagrik Sahkari Bank", “Sahakari Grahak Bhandar” and “Dugdha Udpadak Sahakari Sanstha. By establishing these cooperative societies Baba not only gave them spiritual guidance but also practical approach to solve their day to day problems of life.

 Baba established “Manav Mandir" for the all-round development of his disciples and their children. “The Manav Mandir” consists of school, playground, houses, Library and seminar Hall where thousands of disciples gather on every 15 November and bring food with them. After the preaching and havan they eat together and enjoy togetherness.

 Baba believed in the doctrine of “health is wealth” because only a healthy person can understand the real meaning of life and can enjoy the blessing of God. For this purpose he established a charitable hospital near Mohadi Village in Bhandara District.

 Baba was apostle of uninterested service to mankind. He advocated that the core Principal of Manav Dharma is selfless sacrifice. Baba was not satisfied with the existing democracy of the country and thought that the country is ruled by rich and misguided people. The day to day discourses of people are against the divine law. The conditions of the country are deteriorating day by day and to save the country from this predicament Baba has urged the people for the creation of “Satya Yuga” by establishing Truth in the universe.

 Disciples coming on this path cannot be ever sad in his life after getting rid of grief and suffering. And cannot remain poor. This is Baba's claim. However, the 4 Elements, 3 Words and 5 Rules given by the baba's should always have to follow by all disciples and the words of Baba should be understood by understanding the word of God. Dated 24th Feb 1991, Sevak Sammelan, Nagpur.

Messages of Baba towards Humanist

Baba has given down to earth messages to his disciples from time to time. Glimpses of his message are as listed below:-

I).	To follow the path of “Manav Dharma abandon the outdated ideas.

II).	Do not follow the wrong traditions.

III).	Prohibit bad ideas.

IV).	Prohibition of intoxicating substances and keep God's blessing in the heart.

V).	Follow the basics of truth love and dignity.

VI).	Worship one God.

VII).	Keep unity in family in particular and society in general.

VIII).	To get peace and happiness be human first and wise later.

IX).	Believe in hard work.

X).	God can't be in any form but he is found in truths, faith, confidence and patience.

XI).	Determination makes confidence, sacrifices creates, patience, God has created life by embedding soul into matter.

XII).	So far the human is not satisfied completely, the idea “Manav Mandir” cannot be accomplished and that is why soul should be cleansed purified.

XIII).	Rather than waiting for the Gods blessing man should keep on doing his job and duties with unity and integrity. God will punish all those who deviate from the path of ethics taught by Dharma.

XIV).	As per the Religious time scale we are heading back to “Satya Yuga” after “Treta Yuga”, “Dvapara Yuga” and “Kali Yuga”. In this age only those people will survive from destruction who are on the “Side of Truth” and “Dharma”. Therefore, every citizen of country should have truths, self-esteem and love to make their life successful.

XV).	Today prevalence of corruption can't be eradicated unless man himself tries to change the world through truth, self-esteem and love.

XVI).	Man is the only rational animal who can understand truth is God and God's Truth. Therefore, Baba Jumdevji has urged people to wake up as course of reformation is imminent and those who are aware and enlightened would survive. The key of success in life and source to achieve God is to adopt the “Principles of Truth, self-esteem and love”.

XVII).	The World appears to be divided because we have diversified ideas and thoughts, though the Earth is one and the God is one. According to Baba Joomdevji's philosophy to achieve God the dedication is needed and needs more focus on the deeds we do on a daily basis. We integration of ideas and thoughts to consolidate the divided world. The real aim of this philosophy is recognition of the self.

XVIII).	God dwells there where mercy, pity, peace and love dwell.

XIX).	You start to live when you commit your life to cause higher than yourself. You must learn to depend on divine power for the fulfillment of a higher calling.

XX).	There are only two cast of human in this world i.e. male and female. All other caste and religions are made by human being. So, do not discriminate others on the basis of cast, religion, wealth. Keep the unity in the society and remain united.

Contributions

Achievement:

As always seen in India many families suffer a lot due to alcoholism and many harmful bad addictions and habits like Alcohol, Gambling, Lottery, Cock-fighting, Stealing causes them unable to get the better standard of living which usually they should get. By following the preaching's of "Mahantyagi Baba Jumdevji" millions of people and their families have got success in eradicating the alcoholism and all such bad addictions which was stopping the growth of their families.

Superstition in India is considered a widespread social problem like Nimbu totka, Lemon and chillies can ward off evil, The mourning family of a dead person should not cook food until shraddha, Don't cut nails after sunset, Do not sweep after sunset, Don't wash your hair on a certain day, burying the umbilical cord in the fork of a sapling tree or storing it in a copper capsule, Don't step out during an eclipse, Do not sleep with your head facing the North, Wearing gemstones brings good fortune etc... and many more.

But, Mahantyagi Baba Jumdevji brought about great social reforms in society and taught people to live their lives without superstitions which resulted in Millions of people are following their path without any hesitations and helped to eradicate superstitious thoughts from millions of people.

Baba was farsighted in his approach and preached family planning laying down following conditions for his followers,
  a. One should not have more than two issues and should follow family planning measures consulting the doctors.

  b. The age of marriage for a male should not be less than 25 years and Baba advocated proper gap between two issues, so that the family size should be small and the mother remains healthy.
A highly contagious and deadly disease spreads around the world, forcing scientists to scramble for a cure they aren't sure exists. Few diseases and chronic conditions that doctors know how to treat, but still aren't sure how to cure the Incurable diseases like Leprosy, Infection, Paralysis, Thalassemia, Sickle Cell Anemia, AIDS, Diabetes, and cancer, etc... Baba Jumdevji shared with them the blessings which he found during enlightenment and worked towards betterment of such unprivileged people and thousands of such families are now cured their diseases.

Awards/Recognition

1.	State:

Parampujya Parmatma Ek Sevak Mandal, Nagpur is awarded the prestigious Rashtrapita Mahatma Gandhi Vyasanmukti Seva Puraskar, 2018–19 on 3 February 2019 by The Ministry of Social Justice and Special Assistance Division, Maharashtra State.

This award is given as recognition of Baba Jumdevji's work in educating society for prevention of substance and alcohol abuse through Manavdharm.

On this occasion State social justice minister Shri Rajkumar Badole, Padma Shri Dr. Abhay Bang and Marathi Actress Nishigandha Wad were present.

2.	National:
  a.	Commemorative Stamp on Jumdevji Thubrikar, popularly known as Baba Jumdevji (Joomdev)

  b.	India Post issued a commemorative stamp on philanthropist and spiritual leader, Jumdevji Thubrikar, popularly known as Baba Jumdevji (Baba Joomdev) on 30 Sept. 2013.

  c.	Vice President of India Mohammed Hamid Ansari released the Commemorative Postage Stamp in the memory of Baba Jumdevji on 30 Sept. 2013 at a function held at Gondia, Maharashtra. Governor of Maharashtra K Sankaranarayanan presided over the function. Praful Patel, Union Minister for Heavy Industries, Col. K. C. Mishra, Chief Postmaster General Maharashtra & Goa Circle and other dignitaries were present on the occasion.

  d.	Vice President Hamid Ansari said the path shown by Jumdev Baba, who brought about great social reforms and taught people to live their lives without superstitions, is still very relevant.
He said this at a function where he released a commemorative postal stamp of Jumdev Baba, the founder of the Parmatma Ek Sevak community.

The function, organized under the aegis of the Parampujya Parmatma Ek Sewak Mandal, Nagpur, was chaired by Maharashtra Governor K Sankarnarayan. Union Minister for Heavy Industries and Public Enterprises Praful Patel was the chief guest.

Impact by the work done by Mahan Tyagi Baba Jumdevji

Contribution to the Field:
 1) Superstition eradication:
By teaching mankind to behave in humanity with human spirit, destroying superstitions by destroying man's evil mind, spiritism, machinations, medical and mental disorders and by giving message of self-sufficiency by overcoming superstitious people. 
 2) Deliverance from Bad Addiction:
Freedom from bad addiction prevents the loss of life in all levels of human beings. That gives strength to man's financial condition and helps people to increase their livelihood. It also avoids doing bad things in society. For example, alcohol, gambling, lottery, other bad addiction diminishes human life. 
 3) Family Planning:
Our country has many uneducated and poor people, and India's population is growing rapidly day by day. Therefore, the progress of human beings is being reduced. Therefore, to improve the economic condition of human beings and to lead a happy life, in order to keep your family limited, without any discrimination between boys and girls. 
 4) Racial discrimination:
The Lord created only two species of men and women on earth. Every man and woman are part of the Lord, therefore, giving the message to the universe, as God to be seen in every human soul without making distinction between any caste and religion, destroying casteism. 
 5) Dowry:
Baba Jumdevji followers are following his principles and doing marriages of their daughter without giving dowry and sticking to the following plan and which caused millions of people eradicated Dowry system and which allowed to save many lives.
  I.	Educate your daughters.
  II.	Encourage them to have their own career.
  III.	Teach them to be independent and responsible.
  IV.	Treat them (your daughter) equally without any discrimination.
  V.	Do not encourage the practice of giving or taking dowry

 6) Child marriage ban:
Baba was farsighted in his approach and preached family planning laying down below conditions for his followers on Marriage,	The age of marriage for a male should not be less than 25 years and Baba advocated proper gap between two issues, so that the family size should be small and the mother remains healthy. 
 7) Social Equality:
Baba Jumdevji always used to say, there are only two cast of human in this world i.e. male and female. All other caste and religions are made by human being. So, do not discriminate others on the basis of cast, religion, wealth. Keep the unity in the society and remain united. The main objective of this religion is that man should behave like a man and his life should be based on dedication, sacrifice, mercy, forgiveness and peace and this is the real "Manav Dharma" that serves social equality in society. 
 8) Poverty Reduction:
Baba Jumdevji done very impressive work on eradicating the poverty from their disciples family. He established "Sevak Nagrik Sahkari Bank",  “Sahakari Grahak Bhandar ” and “Dugdha Udpadak  Sahakari Sanstha and many more. By establishing these cooperative societies Baba not only gave them spiritual guidance but also helped them to solve their day to day problems of life. 
 9) Cleanliness Campaign:
Baba Jumdevji disciples always follow their principles and according to their teachings wandered to different villages promoting social justice and initiating reforms, especially related to sanitation like Gram Swachhata Abhiyaan. 
 10) Alcohol Ban:
As always seen in India many families suffer a lot due to alcoholism and many harmful bad addictions and habits like Alcohol, Gambling, Lottery, Cock-fighting, Stealing causes them unable to get the better standard of living which usually they should get. By following the preachings and messages of Mahantyagi Baba Joomdevji millions of people and their families have got success in eradicating the alcoholism and all such bad addictions which was stopping the growth of their families.

Contribution to the Society:
  I.	Mahantyagi Baba Jumdevji brought about great social reforms in society and taught people to live their lives without superstitions which resulted in Millions of people are following their path without any hesitations and helped to eradicate superstitious thoughts from millions of people. Along with it Baba Jumdevji have stressed on eradicating bad addiction, racial discriminations without making distinction between any caste and religion, destroying casteism, child marriage, social inequality, poverty and many other society problems which millions of people had in their life and by following their preaching's and path all such families have got success in eradicating the alcoholism and all such bad addictions which was stopping the growth of their families.

  II.	Mahantyagi Baba Jumdevji established cooperative system for his downtrodden followers who were not only poor but also illiterate. The followers were exploited by the vicious system of money lenders. To save them from this vicious system Baba propounded the philosophy of cooperative system and fund raining for their welfare. On this philosophy he established "Sevak Nagrik Sahkari Bank", "Sahakari Grahak Bhandar" and "Dugdha Udpadak  Sahakari Sanstha". By establishing these cooperative societies Baba not only gave them spiritual guidance but also practical approach to solve their day to day problems of life.

  III.	Baba was against dividing humans in the name of religion and religious practices because according to his philosophy dividing humans is like dividing God.

  IV.	The current situation of corruption cannot be handled and controlled by human beings but it can be brought into control only by God's grace and divine power. If the human beings want to keep themselves secure from the transformation of the Age, they need to follow the path of Truth, Good Conduct and Love to get the divine peace. This message was conveyed on 1 September 1980.

  V.	Baba was farsighted in his approach and preached family planning laying down following conditions for his followers,

    a.	One should not have more than two issues and should follow family planning measures consulting the doctors.

    b.	The age of marriage for a male should not be less than 25 years and Baba advocated proper gap between two issues, so that the family size should be small and the mother remains healthy.

References

Hindu denominations